Feliks Aleksanders Zemdegs (born 20 December 1995) is an Australian Rubik's Cube speedsolver. He is the only speedcuber ever to win the World Cube Association World Championship twice, winning in 2013 and 2015, and is widely considered the most successful and greatest speedcuber of all time. He has set more than 350 records across various speedcubing events: 121 world records, 211 continental records, and 6 national records.

Biography
Feliks Zemdegs is of Latvian descent and his maternal grandmother is Lithuanian. Zemdegs bought his first speedcube in April 2008 after being inspired by speedcubing videos and tutorials on YouTube. The first unofficial time he recorded was an average of 19.73 seconds on 14 June 2008. He has been using CFOP to solve the 3×3×3 since he was 12 years old, the Yau method to solve the 4×4×4 and 5x5x5, the CLL method to solve the 2×2×2, and the Reduction method for 6x6x6 and 7×7×7.

Zemdegs won the 3×3×3 event at the first competition he attended, the New Zealand Championships 2009 on 18 July 2009, with an average of 13.74 seconds in the final round. He also won 2×2×2, 4×4×4, 5×5×5, 3×3×3 blindfolded, and 3×3×3 one-handed.

At his next competition, the Melbourne Summer Open 2010 on 30 January 2010, Zemdegs set his first world records for 3×3×3 average and 4×4×4 average, with times of 9.21 seconds and 42.01 seconds, respectively. He held the 3×3×3 average world record continuously from then until 23 April 2017, improving it 8 times, eventually to 6.45 seconds.  The most world records he has ever held at one time is 12, in May 2011. As recently as 28 January 2017, he held 11 of those records concurrently.

At the World Championship 2011 in Bangkok, Zemdegs won 2×2×2, 4×4×4, 5×5×5, and 6×6×6.  He also took third in 3×3×3 after winning the first three rounds, and placed third in 7×7×7.  At the World Championship 2013 in Las Vegas, Zemdegs won 3×3×3, 4×4×4, and 3×3×3 One-handed.  He also placed second in 5×5×5 and third in 7×7×7. At the World Championship 2015 in São Paulo, Zemdegs won 3×3×3, 2×2×2, 4×4×4, and 5×5×5. He also placed second in 6×6×6, 7×7×7, and Megaminx.  At the World Championship 2017 in Paris, Zemdegs won 5×5×5 and 7×7×7.  He also took second in 6×6×6, 3×3×3 One-handed, and Megaminx, and placed third in 4×4×4. At the World Championship 2019 in Melbourne, Zemdegs only podiumed in one event, getting third in 5x5x5.

Zemdegs has a website, CubeSkills, which includes tutorials on solving the Rubik's Cube and other puzzles. There are free algorithm sheets, and some free speedsolving tutorial videos. The site also offers a premium membership, which enables access to advanced speed solving videos.

Zemdegs attended St Kevin's College, Toorak and graduated in 2013 with a perfect study score in VCE English and an ATAR of 99.90. Zemdegs has a Bachelor of Commerce from the University of Melbourne, majoring in economics, with a breadth study track in mechanical engineering.

In 2020, Zemdegs was one of the primary subjects of the Netflix documentary The Speed Cubers.

, Zemdegs' YouTube channel has more than 475,000 subscribers.

World records

World records by Zemdegs.

Official personal records 
Listed below are Zemdegs' personal records achieved in official World Cube Association competitions.

Media appearances
 2 June 2009 – Herald Sun article (Australia)
 3 June 2009 – Channel 9 Today program (Australia)
 18 July 2009 – TVNZ 1 News (New Zealand)
 20 July 2009 – The Dominion Post article (New Zealand)
 21 January 2010 – Stonnington Leader article (Australia)
 17 July 2010 – The Australian newspaper article (Australia)
 21 July 2010 – Herald Sun article (Australia)
 26 July 2010 – The Sydney Morning Herald video (Australia)
 27 July 2010 – The Age article (Australia)
 6 September 2010 – Melbourne Leader article (Australia)
 9 November 2010 – Test Australia: The National IQ Test solving demonstration
 16 November 2010 – Ninemsn article (Australia)
 19 November 2010 – Yahoo News video (United States)
 2 June 2011 – ABC Catalyst video (Australia)
 9 February 2012 – The New York Times article (United States)
 30 November 2012 – 92.5 Gold FM interview (Australia)
 3 May 2014 – The Guardian article (Great Britain)
 27 November 2014 – IOL South Africa
 23 July 2015 – Huffington Post (United States)
 11 September 2015 – Sydney Morning Herald
 25 March 2016 – The Brain (China) game show
27 August 2017 – Little Big Shots show (Australia)
 29 July 2020 – The Speed Cubers - Netflix Documentary
 11 December 2021 – The Guardian Rubik's Cube's second coming (Great Britain)

References

External links

Feliks Zemdegs Reddit Questionnaire (3 January 2013)
Feliks Zemdegs tutorial website (14 March 2017)
How to Start Speedcubing by Feliks Zemdegs

Living people
1995 births
Australian speedcubers
Australian people of Latvian descent
Australian people of Lithuanian descent
People from Melbourne